China National GeneBank or CNGB is China's first national-level gene storage bank, approved and funded by the Chinese government. Based in the Dapeng Peninsula of Shenzhen, CNGB's mission is to support public welfare, life science research and innovation, as well as industry incubation, through effective bioresource conservation, digitalization and utilization.

In 2011 the Chinese National Development and Reform Commission (NDRC), Ministry of Finance, Ministry of Industry and Information Technology, and Ministry of Health and Family Planning approved the establishment of the Centre, entrusting BGI with its construction in a public-private partnership. After 5-years of development the first phase of the centre opened in September 2016, spanning more than 47,500 square meters and including a biorepository, a bioinformatics data center and a living biobank. The Centre also has a Synthetic Biology platform collaborating with Australia's Macquarie University and Harvard  on metabolic engineering and the development of high-density DNA storage technology.

See also
 Australia Bioinformatics Resource
 Australian Grains Genebank
 DNA Data Bank of Japan (DDBJ)
 European Bioinformatics Institute (EBI)
 National Center for Biotechnology Information (NCBI)
 Svalbard Global Seed Vault
 Swiss Institute of Bioinformatics (Expasy)
 Ruili Botanical Garden

References

External links
Official site
Official site (English)

Molecular biology
Biological databases
Biobanks
Biobank organizations
Research institutes in China
Genetics or genomics research institutions